5154 aluminium alloy is an alloy in the wrought aluminium-magnesium family (5000 or 5xxx series). As an aluminium-magnesium alloy, it combines moderate-to-high strength with excellent weldability. 5154 aluminium is commonly used in welded structures such as pressure vessels and ships. As a wrought alloy, it can be formed by rolling, extrusion, and forging, but not casting. It can be cold worked to produce tempers with a higher strength but a lower ductility. It is generally not clad.

Alternate names and designations include AlMg3.5, N5, and A95154. The alloy and its various tempers are covered by the following standards:

 ASTM B 209: Standard Specification for Aluminium and Aluminium-Alloy Sheet and Plate
 ASTM B 210: Standard Specification for Aluminium and Aluminium-Alloy Drawn Seamless Tubes
 ASTM B 211: Standard Specification for Aluminium and Aluminium-Alloy Bar, Rod, and Wire
 ASTM B 221: Standard Specification for Aluminium and Aluminium-Alloy Extruded Bars, Rods, Wire, Profiles, and Tubes
 ASTM B 547: Standard Specification for Aluminium and Aluminium-Alloy Formed and Arc-Welded Round Tube
 ISO 6361: Wrought Aluminium and Aluminium Alloy Sheets, Strips and Plates

Chemical composition

The alloy composition of 5154 aluminium is:

 Aluminium: 94.4 to 96.8%
 Chromium: 0.15 to 0.35%
 Copper: 0.1% max
 Iron: 0.4% max
 Magnesium: 3.1 to 3.9%
 Manganese: 0.1%
 Silicon: 0.25% max
 Titanium: 0.2% max
 Zinc: 0.2% max
 Residuals: 0.15% max

The similar alloy A5254 differs only in impurities limits.

Properties

Typical material properties for 5154 aluminium alloy include:

 Density: 2.66 g/cm3, or 166 lb/ft3.
 Young's modulus: 69 GPa, or 10 Msi.
 Electrical conductivity: 32% IACS.
 Ultimate tensile strength: 230 to 330 MPa, or 33 to 48 ksi.
 Thermal Conductivity: 130 W/m-K.
 Thermal Expansion: 23.9 μm/m-K.

References

Aluminium alloy table 

Aluminium–magnesium alloys